Dolci may refer to:

 Dolci, an Italian surname:
 Angelo Dolci (1867-1939), Italian cardinal
 Carlo Dolci (1616-1686), Italian painter
 Danilo Dolci (1924-1997), Italian social activist, sociologist, popular educator and poet
 Sebastiano Dolci (1699-1777), Croatian writer
 Dolci, Croatia, a village near Orahovica
Plural of dolce, Italian desserts

See also
Dolce (disambiguation), singular of dolci